Mark Johnson is a Hall of Fame College Baseball Coach who coached the Texas A&M Aggies baseball team from 1985 to 2005 and Sam Houston State from 2007 to 2011. Johnson led the Aggies to the NCAA playoffs 13 times, College World Series appearances in 1993 and 1999, won the Big 12 Conference regular-season crown in 1998 and 1999, won the Southwest Conference championship three times (1986, 1989, 1993). Johnson retired with 1,043 career wins.

With Sam Houston State, he led the Bearkats to three Southland Conference baseball tournament championships and three NCAA Regional appearances in 5 years as head coach. Johnson coached his 1,000th career win during his fourth season with the Bearkats on March 8, 2010. He was the 44th head baseball coach to pass 1,000 career wins. In his first 4 years at Sam Houston, his Bearkats had set 26 school records, and also produced 7 Academic All-Southland players.

References

Year of birth missing (living people)
Living people
Arizona Wildcats baseball coaches
Mississippi State Bulldogs baseball coaches
New Mexico Lobos baseball coaches
New Mexico Lobos baseball players
Sam Houston Bearkats baseball coaches
Texas A&M Aggies baseball coaches